David Morales (born 29 September 2003), is an American racing driver of Dominican and Argentine descent currently competing in the 2022 GB3 Championship with Arden Motorsport.

Career

Karting
From 2012-2014, Morales competed in various karting championships in his home state of Florida. His best result was 8th, in the Rotax Micro Max category of the 2012 Florida Winter Tour.

Lucas Oil Formula Car Race Series
Morales made his car racing debut in the 2019 Lucas Oil Formula Car Race Series.

NACAM Formula 4 Championship
Morales competed in the 2019-20 NACAM Formula 4 Championship with Euromotor Sport, where he finished 9th in the standings with one podium.

F4 British Championship
In 2021, Morales stepped up to the F4 British Championship with Arden International. He came 18th in the standings with two podiums.

Formula Regional Asian Championship
Morales raced in the 2022 Formula Regional Asian Championship with Evans GP Academy. He finished 33rd in the standings.

GB3 Championship
Morales competed in the 2022 GB3 Championship with Arden International. He claimed 3rd place at Oulton Park for his one and only podium finish, and finished 22nd in the overall standings.

Formula Regional Oceania Championship
On 10 December 2022, it was announced that Morales would compete in the 2023 Formula Regional Oceania Championship with M2 Competition. He won race 3 of round 1 at Highlands Motorsport Park, the Dorothy Smith Memorial Cup, his first win of his single-seater racing career.

Karting record

Karting career summary

Racing record

Racing career summary

* Season still in progress.

Complete F4 British Championship results 
(key) (Races in bold indicate pole position) (Races in italics indicate fastest lap)

Complete Formula Regional Asian Championship results
(key) (Races in bold indicate pole position) (Races in italics indicate the fastest lap of top ten finishers)

Complete GB3 Championship results 
(key) (Races in bold indicate pole position) (Races in italics indicate fastest lap)

Complete Formula Regional Oceania Championship Results
(key) (Races in bold indicate pole position) (Races in italics indicate fastest lap)

References

External links
 

2003 births
Living people
American racing drivers
British F4 Championship drivers
BRDC British Formula 3 Championship drivers
Formula Regional Asian Championship drivers
Arden International drivers
Toyota Racing Series drivers
M2 Competition drivers
NACAM F4 Championship drivers
Racing drivers from Florida
JHR Developments drivers